Fisetinidin is an anthocyanidin. It has been obtained from the heartwood of Acacia mearnsii, from the bark of Rhizophora apiculata and can also be synthesized. Fisetinidin is very similar in structure to fisetin, which itself differs in structure from quercetin only by an additional hydroxyl group on the latter. 

An assay of twenty flavonoids showed fisetinidin to be the least effective in inhibition of CD38 enzyme.

Tannins 
Fisetinidin can compose tannins. The polymers are then called profisetinidin (Porter, 1992).

See also 
 Leuco-fisetinidin
 List of compounds with carbon number 15

References 

Anthocyanidins
Catechols